Cedar Bluff is a town in Cherokee County, Alabama, United States. At the 2020 census, the population was 1,845. Unlike the rest of the county, Cedar Bluff is a wet town. Cedar Bluff is located on the north shore of Weiss Lake, noted for its crappie fishing.

History 
A post office called Cedar Bluff has been in operation since 1837. Once the county seat from about 1836 to 1844 before being removed to Centre, the city was named for groves of cedar trees above the bluffs of the nearby river.

The Cornwall Furnace near Cedar Bluff is listed on the National Register of Historic Places.

Geography
Cedar Bluff is located northeast of the center of Cherokee County at 34°13'14.182" North, 85°35'45.596" West (34.220606, -85.595999).

The town is bordered on the north, west, and south by Weiss Lake.

Demographics

2020 census

As of the 2020 United States census, there were 1,845 people, 876 households, and 507 families residing in the town.

2010 census
As of the census of 2010, there were 1,820 people, 766 households, and 521 families residing in the town. The racial makeup of the town was 86.2% White, 9.9% Black or African American, 0.7% Native American, 0.3% Asian, 0.5% from other races, and 2.4% from two or more races. 1.2% of the population were Hispanic or Latino of any race.

There were 766 households, out of which 21.9% had children under the age of 18 living with them, 49.0% were married couples living together, 14.4% had a female householder with no husband present, and 32.0% were non-families. 28.6% of all households were made up of individuals, and 12.8% had someone living alone who was 65 years of age or older. The average household size was 2.38 and the average family size was 2.87.

In the town, the population was spread out, with 21.4% under the age of 18, 8.6% from 18 to 24, 20.0% from 25 to 44, 30.9% from 45 to 64, and 19.0% who were 65 years of age or older. The median age was 45 years. For every 100 females, there were 93.6 males. For every 100 females age 18 and over, there were 92.9 males.

The median income for a household in the town was $35,143, and the median income for a family was $37,500. Males had a median income of $31,016 versus $26,583 for females. The per capita income for the town was $19,469. About 22.8% of families and 25.7% of the population were below the poverty line, including 41.0% of those under age 18 and 8.5% of those age 65 or over.

Education
Cedar Bluff Public Schools are part of the Cherokee County School District. Schools in the district include Cedar Bluff School, Centre Elementary School, Gaylesville School, Sand Rock School, Centre Middle School, Cherokee County High School, Spring Garden High School and Cherokee County Career & Technology Center. Cedar Bluff School is located in Cedar Bluff.

Mitchell Guice is the Superintendent of Schools.

Notable people
John L. Burnett, U.S. Representative from 1899 to 1919
Tina Gordon, NASCAR driver

References

External links
 Town of Cedar Bluff official website

Towns in Alabama
Towns in Cherokee County, Alabama